Teta may refer to:

 TETA, abbreviation for Triethylenetetramine
 15374 Teta, an asteroid
 Teta Lando, an Angolan musician
 Teta Hyral, a character in Final Fantasy Tactics video game
 Empress Teta, an Old Republic character in the Star Wars universe
 Teta (Czech mythology), a mythical female magician of 8th century Czech mythology, the sister of Libuše
 Teta (film), an American short film
 La Teta y la Luna, a Spanish/French film
 La Teta Asustada, a Peruvian film

See also
Tetas (disambiguation)